Vallejo City Unified School District is a medium-sized K-12 school district in the U.S. state of California, serving 14,468 students (2017-18 school year). The district comprises 16 K-5 schools, two middle schools serving grades 6-8,two comprehensive high schools, a continuation school, a community day school, and a unique school which provides support to families who choose an independent study/home study option. In addition, the district has an extensive child development and preschool program and an adult school which serves 4,000 adults.

Schools
The Vallejo City Unified School District as of (2019-2020) includes 16 elementary schools, three middle schools, and two high schools. The Vallejo City Unified School District also has five alternative public education schools or programs including one adult school (Vallejo Regional Education Center).

Elementary schools
Beverly Hills Elementary(closed)
Cooper Elementary
Federal Terrace Elementary
Glen Cove Elementary
Highland Elementary
Lincoln Elementary
Loma Vista Elementary (K-8)
Mare Island Health & FItness Academy (K-8)
Dan Mini Elementary
Patterson Elementary
Pennycook Elementary
Steffan Manor Elementary
Vallejo Charter School (dependent charter)
Wardlaw Elementary
Widenmann Elementary(closed)
Elmer Cave Elementary was changed to Cave Dual Language Academy in 2010 (K-8)

Middle schools
Vallejo Middle School(closed)
Benjamin Franklin Middle School (closed)
Springstowne Middle School (closed)
Solano Widemann Leadership Academy 
Hogan Middle School

High schools
Vallejo High School
Jesse M. Bethel High School

Alternative schools
Farragut Leadership Academy
Independent Study Academy
John Finney High School
Vallejo Regional Education Center (adult school)

Independent Charter schools 

 Mare Island Technology (MIT) Academy Middle School (independent, 6-8)
Griffin Academy Middle School (independent, 6-8)
 MIT (Mare Island Technology) Academy High School (independent, 9-12)
 Griffin Academy High School (independent high school opened Fall 2020)
 Caliber Changemakers Academy (independent, K-8)
 Elite Public Schools (independent, K-12)

References

External links
 

School districts in Solano County, California
Schools in Vallejo, California